A partial solar eclipse occurred at the Moon's ascending node of the orbit on Monday, November 3, 1975. A solar eclipse occurs when the Moon passes between Earth and the Sun, thereby totally or partly obscuring the image of the Sun for a viewer on Earth. A partial solar eclipse occurs in the polar regions of the Earth when the center of the Moon's shadow misses the Earth.

Related eclipses

Eclipses in 1975 
 A partial solar eclipse on Sunday, 11 May 1975.
 A total lunar eclipse on Sunday, 25 May 1975.
 A partial solar eclipse on Monday, 3 November 1975.
 A total lunar eclipse on Tuesday, 18 November 1975.

Solar eclipses of 1975–1978

Metonic series

References

External links 

1975 11 3
1975 in science
1975 11 3
November 1975 events